Seeds is the third studio album by Canadian indie rock band Hey Rosetta!. It was released on February 15, 2011 through Sonic Records and was produced by Tony Doogan.

Lead singer Tim Baker stated in an interview that the album name, as well as the title track, is about "...the idea is that we are seeds, traveling from town to town, blowing around, settling down here and there, trying to make something for people", and that "the songs are seeds ... they’re these little things –- four and five minute things — but they have the ability to grow in your brain and be far more meaningful than just what they are."

Reception
Seeds has received generally favorable reviews. Kate Harper of CHARTattack noted that the album "...succeeds in ways Lungs – though a good album – did not ... there's definitely more of a robust feel throughout all of Seeds." Richard Trapunski of Now Magazine gave a more mixed review: "Aiming for the same puffed-up collective catharsis as Arcade Fire, Tim Baker and co. layer strings, horns, mandolins and anything else they can get their hands on to inflate the songs into anthems."

On June 16, the album was named as a longlisted nominee (one of 40) for the 2011 Polaris Music Prize. On July 6, the album was named as a shortlisted (one of 10) nominee for the 2011 award.

Track listing

Release history

References 

Hey Rosetta! albums
2011 albums